Wally Masur and Jason Stoltenberg were the defending champions, but competed this year with different partners. Masur teamed up with Mark Kratzmann and lost in the semifinals to Jim Grabb and Richey Reneberg, while Stoltenberg teamed up with Todd Nelson and lost in quarterfinals to Pieter Aldrich and Danie Visser.

Jim Grabb and Richey Reneberg won the title by defeating Pieter Aldrich and Danie Visser 6–4, 7–5 in the final.

Seeds

Draw

Draw

References

External links
 Official results archive (ATP)
 Official results archive (ITF)

Doubles